Beatriz Valdés Fidalgo (born May 12, 1963, in Havana) is a Cuban-Venezuelan actress.

She was born in Cuba, where she studied drama and worked as an actress before she arrived to Venezuela as a guest at the Cinema Interamerican Forum in 1989. She gave birth to her first child there in 1991.

Filmography

Soap operas
 100 días para enamorarnos (2020)
Mi familia perfecta (2018)
Santa Diabla (2013)
Válgame Dios (2012)
La mujer perfecta (2010)
La vida entera (2008)
Arroz con leche (2008)
Ciudad bendita (2006–2007)
El amor las vuelve locas (2005)
Cosita rica (2003)
Las González (2002)
Guerra de mujeres (2001)
Amantes de Luna Llena (2000)
Luisa Fernanda (1999)
Reina de corazones (1998)
Cambio de piel (1998)
Volver a vivir (1996)
El paseo de la gracia de Dios (1993)
Piel (1992)
Algo más que soñar (1984)

Films
Azul y no tan rosa (2013)
Perfecto amor equivocado (2004)
Amor en concreto (2003)
Manuela Sáenz (2000)
100 años de perdón (1998)
La voz del corazón (1997)
La bella del Alhambra (1989)
Hoy como ayer (1987)
Capablanca (1987)
Como la vida misma (1987)
Lejanía (1985)
Los pájaros tirándole a la escopeta (1982)
Una nueva criatura (1970)

External links 

1963 births
Living people
Cuban television actresses
Venezuelan telenovela actresses
Cuban film actresses
Venezuelan film actresses
Cuban emigrants to Venezuela
People from Havana
20th-century Cuban actresses
21st-century Cuban actresses